Jasem Jaderi (born 1967) is an Iranian reformist politician, and the former governor of Hormozgan Province. Jaderi was born in Susangerd in Khuzestan Province. From 2013 to 2017 he has served in the Government of Hassan Rouhani. Jaderi is a member of National Trust Party.

References

1967 births
Governors of Hormozgan Province
People from Khuzestan Province
Living people
National Trust Party (Iran) politicians